Carcinology is a branch of zoology that consists of the study of crustaceans, a group of arthropods that includes lobsters, crayfish, shrimp, krill, copepods, barnacles and crabs. Other names for carcinology are malacostracology, crustaceology, and crustalogy, and a person who studies crustaceans is a carcinologist or occasionally a malacostracologist, a crustaceologist, or a crustalogist.

Subfields
Carcinology is a subdivision of arthropodology, the study of arthropods which includes arachnids, insects, and myriapods. Carcinology branches off into taxonomically oriented disciplines such as:
 astacology – the study of crayfish
 cirripedology – the study of barnacles
 copepodology – the study of copepods

Journals
Scientific journals devoted to the study of crustaceans include:
 Crustaceana
 Journal of Crustacean Biology
 ''Nauplius (journal)

See also

 Entomology
 Publications in carcinology
 List of carcinologists

References

 
Crustaceans
Subfields of zoology
Subfields of arthropodology